A tag (Aramaic: , plural) is a decoration drawn over some Hebrew letters in the Jewish scrolls of Sifrei Kodesh, Tefillin and Mezuzot. Both  and  mean 'crown' in Aramaic and Hebrew respectively.

Placement 

In modern practice, the letters Beth, Daleth, He, Heth, Yud and Quf have one tag (Mnemonic: BeDeQ-ChaYaH ). The letters Gimel, Zayin, Tet, Nun, Ayin, Tzadi and Shin, as far back as Talmudic times, have 3 tags (Mnemonic: Sha´ATNeZ-GaTz ). Some manuscripts feature embellished  on the top line of each column and some also on all occurrences of the Tetragrammaton other than those prefixed with a lamed.

Sefer Tagin 

About the 2nd century CE, a work called Sefer Tagin ( or ) emerged attributed to Rabbi Akiva which laid out the 1960 places where modified tagin or letter forms occur in a Torah scroll. In it, the locations of letters which receive a number of tagin which differs from the sha'atnez gatz tradition, e.g. the initial beit of bereshith in  having 4 tagin as opposed to the usual 1 and the instances of aleph which bear 7 tagin apiece. According to this work, each occurrence of each letter is to be written with between 0 and 7 tagin, as delineated in the lists contained therein.

Maimonides 
This tradition, predating the versification of the Torah text, contains some instruction wherein it is difficult to know what verses are being referenced, thus in the 12th century, Maimonides ruled that though a scribe should do his utmost to incorporate all of the elements of this tradition, called otiyyot meshunot (strange letters), if they are omitted, whether in full or in part, the scroll would not be ruled as pasul (invalid).

Interpretation 
The Talmud states that  was originally added to the text by God at Mount Sinai, and that Rabbi Akiva would use their presence in order to derive laws.

In kabbalistic thought, each  has special significance and meaning.

See also

References

External links 

 Learning About Tagin (UnderstandingHebrew.com)
 Sofer (scribal) penmanship for ritual STA"M use of Kulmusim quill 
 Halachic origins in Gemara, the Babylonian Tractate Menachot 29
 Conventions in use 

Hebrew calligraphy
Hebrew words and phrases in Jewish law
Jewish law and rituals
Serif typefaces
Talmud concepts and terminology
Torah